Antonius is a masculine given name, as well as a surname. Antonius is a Danish, Dutch, Finnish, Latin, Norwegian, and Swedish name used in Greenland, Denmark, Norway, Sweden, Finland, part of the Republic of Karelia, Estonia, Belgium, Netherlands, Suriname, South Africa, Namibia, and Indonesia, while Antoníus is an Icelandic name used in Iceland.  It is also the source of the English personal name Anthony, as well as a number of similar names in various European languages.

Antonius is the nomen of the gens Antonia, an important plebeian family of ancient Rome.  Marcus Antonius claimed that the gens was descended from Anton, a son of Hercules.  Women of the family were called Antonia.  The Antonii produced a number of important generals and politicians, some of whom are listed below.  For other persons with this name, see Antonia (gens).

Marcus Antonius (83–30 BC), ally of Caesar, triumvir and afterwards enemy of Augustus. Probably the most famous of the Antonii, his life is depicted in William Shakespeare's play Antony and Cleopatra.  He promulgated the leges Antoniae of 44 BC, abolishing the office of dictator, re-adjusting provincial commands, confirming Caesar's acta, and granting provocatio to those convicted de maiestate and de vi.

Other Antonii
 Marcus Antonius, the orator, Marcus Antonius' grandfather (died 87 BC)
 Marcus Antonius Creticus, Marcus Antonius' father
 Gaius Antonius Hybrida, Marcus Antonius' uncle
 Gaius Antonius, Marcus Antonius' younger brother (died 42 BC)
 Marcus Antonius, sometimes called Antyllus, Marcus Antonius' eldest son by Fulvia (died 30 BC)
 Iullus Antonius, Marcus Antonius' youngest son by Fulvia (died 2 BC)
 Antonius Natalis, an equestrian, member of the Pisonian conspiracy against Nero
 Marcus Antonius Gordianus I, emperor in AD 238
 Marcus Antonius Gordianus II, emperor in AD 238
 Marcus Antonius Gordianus III, emperor from AD 238 to 244
 Saint Antonius, Father of Christian Monasticism

Other ancient people with the name Antonius

Antonius of Argos, Greek poet, dates unknown
Antonius Rufus, a number of lesser-known men from the ancient Roman empire
Antonius Rufus (grammarian), 1st-century Roman Latin grammarian
Antonius Atticus, 1st-century BC Roman rhetorician
Antonius Castor, 1st-century AD Roman botanist
Antonius (herbalist), 1st-century AD Greek-Roman herbalist mentioned by Galen
Antonius Felix, 1st-century AD Roman Roman procurator of Judea
Antonius Flamma, 1st-century AD Roman governor of Cyrenaica
Antonius Musa, 1st-century AD Greek-Roman botanist and physician
Antonius Diogenes, likely 2nd-century AD Roman novelist
Antonius (philosopher), 4th-century AD Egyptian neoplatonist
Antonius (monk), 5th-century AD Greek monk and disciple of Simeon Stylites

Latinized medieval and Renaissance name
Antonius Agellius (Antonio Agellio; 1532–1608), Italian bishop
Antonius Andreas (c.1280–1320), Spanish Franciscan theologian
Antonius Augustinus (Antonio Agustín y Albanell; 1516–1586), Spanish Humanist historian, jurist and archbishop
Antonius de Butrio (1338–1408), Italian jurist
Antonius Divitis (Anthonius de Rijke; c. 1470 – c. 1530), Flemish composer
Antonius Galli (c.1505–1565), Flemish composer
Antonius Goveanus (António de Gouveia; c.1505–1566), Portuguese humanist and educator
Antonius Mancinellus (1452–1505), Italian humanist pedagogue, grammarian, and rhetorician
Antonius Melissa, 11th century Greek monk and author
Antonius Monchiacenus Demochares (1494–1574), French theologian and canonist
Antonius Nebrissensis (1441–1522), Spanish Renaissance scholar
Antonius Romanus (fl.1400–1432), Italian composer
Antonius Sanderus (1586–1664), Flemish Catholic cleric and historian
Antonius Maria Schyrleus de Rheita (1604–1660), Czech or Austrian astronomer and optician
Antonius Thysius the Elder (1565–1640), Dutch Reformed theologian
Antonius Walaeus (1573–1639), Dutch Calvinist minister and theologian

Adopted name by Roman Catholic clergy
Antonius Subianto Bunjamin (born 1968), Indonesian bishop
Antonius Fischer (1840–1912), German archbishop 
Antonius Hilfrich (1873–1947), German Bishop of Limburg
Antonius Serra (1610–1669), Greek Roman Catholic bishop
Antonius von Steichele (1816–1889), German archbishop
Antonius Grech Delicata Testaferrata (1823–1876), Maltese bishop
Antonius von Thoma (1829–1897), German archbishop

Modern given name
Antonius or Anthonius is a common given name in the Netherlands; in daily life, most people with this name use short forms like Antoine, Anton, Antoni(e), Antoon, Teun, Teunis, Theunis, Theuns, Toine, Ton, Tony, Toon and Twan. 
Antonius Ariantho (born 1973), Indonesian badminton player
Antonius  W.M. "Toon" Becx (1920–2013), Dutch footballer
Antonius J.M. "Anton" Berns (born 1945), Dutch molecular geneticist
Antonius Bouwens (1876–1963),  Dutch sports shooter
Antonius van den Broek (1870–1926), Dutch physicist
Antonius Colenbrander (1889–1929), Dutch equestrian
Antonius "Ton" Cornelissen (born 1964), Dutch footballer
Antonius van Dale (1638–1708), Dutch Mennonite preacher, physician and writer
Antonius S.N.L. "Toon" Dupuis (1877–1937), Belgian-born Dutch sculptor and medallist
Antonius Ebben (1930–2011), Dutch equestrian
Antonius Eisenhoit (1554–1603), German goldsmith, engraver and draftsman
Antonius Johannes "Anton" Geesink (1934–2010), Dutch judoka
Antonius Geurts (born 1932), Dutch sprint canoer
Antonius Jan Glazemaker (born 1931), Dutch Old Catholic archbishop
Antonius Goebouw (1616–1698), Flemish Baroque painter
Antonius Hambroek (1607–1661), Dutch missionary to Formosa
Antonius J.F. "Anton" Hekking (1855–1935), Dutch-born American cellist
Antonius Maria van Heugten (1945–2008), Dutch sidecarcross racer
Antonius Heinsius (1641–1720), Dutch Grand Pensionary of Holland
Antonius Matthias "Anton" Hirschig (1867–1939), Dutch painter, acquaintance of Van Gogh
Antonius J.L. "Anton" van Hooff (born 1943), Dutch historian of antiquity
Antonius A.J. "Anton" Huiskes (1928–2008), Dutch speed skater
Antonius Lambertus Maria Hurkmans (born 1944), Dutch bishop of 's-Hertogenbosch
Antonius Johannes Theodorus Janse (1877–1970), Dutch-born South African entomologist
Antonius Johannes Jurgens (1867–1945), Dutch margarine and soap manufacturer, founder of Unilever
Antonius C. J. de Leeuw (born 1941), Dutch organizational theorist 
Antonius de Liedekerke (1587–1661), Dutch sea captain and ambassador to Morocco
Antonius J.J. "Ton" Lokhoff (born 1959), Dutch football player and coach
Antonius van Loon (1888–1962), Dutch tug of war competitor
Antonius H.J. "Tony" Lovink (1902–1995), Dutch diplomat and last Governor-General of the Dutch East Indies
Antonius Cornelis "Ton" Lutz (1919–2009), Dutch actor
Antonius J.M. "Toine" Manders (born 1956), Dutch VVD politician and MEP
Antonius Mathijsen (1805–1878), Dutch army surgeon, first to use plaster casts
Antonius Mazairac (1901–1966), Dutch track cyclist
Antonius W.M.T. "Toine" van Mierlo (born 1957), Dutch footballer
Antonius Montfoort (1902–1974), Dutch fencer
Antonius van Nieuwenhuizen (1879–1957), Dutch fencer
Antonius van Opbergen (1543–1611), Flemish architect and fortifications engineer
Antonius A.H. "Toon" Oprinsen (1910–1945), Dutch footballer
Antonius Franciscus "Toon" Pastor (born 1929), Dutch boxer
Antonius J.P. "Twan" Poels (born 1963), Dutch cyclist
Antonius Maria "Ton" Richter (1919–2009), Dutch field hockey player 
Antonius Roberts (born 1958), Bahamian artist
 Antonius O.H. "Toon" Tellegen (born 1941), Dutch children's writer, poet, and physician
Antonius F.C. "Anton" Toscani (1901–1984), Dutch race walker
 Antonius H.M. "Ton" van de Ven (1944–2015), Dutch industrial designer
Antonius Wilhelmus "Antoon" Verlegh (1896–1960), Dutch football player and administrator
Antonius Cornelis Franciscus Vorst (born 1952), Dutch financial engineer and mathematician
Antonius Wyngaerde (died 1499), Dutch composer in Antwerp

Modern surname
George Antonius (1891 – 1942), Lebanese-Egyptian author and diplomat
Patrik Antonius (born 1980), Finnish poker player

References

Ancient Roman prosopographical lists
Danish masculine given names
Dutch masculine given names
Finnish masculine given names
Icelandic masculine given names
Latin masculine given names
Norwegian masculine given names
Swedish masculine given names